Alstonia beatricis is a species of plant in the family Apocynaceae. It is endemic to West Papua (Indonesia).

References

beatricis
Endemic flora of Western New Guinea
Taxonomy articles created by Polbot